Lydia Tederick is a White House curator. She arrived in the White House's curatorial office in 1979 and first served as an assistant curator before becoming the eighth White House curator. She has a special focus on the history and workings of the First Ladies as well as the care of the White House's portraits. As curator, however, she is also responsible for research into questions about other Washington, DC statues and sculptures such as the Pierre-Jean David d’Angers statue of Thomas Jefferson, a gift from Uriah Phillips Levy.

Tederick received her Bachelor of Arts in art history and political science from Northern Arizona University and a Master of Arts in museum studies in 1980 from George Washington University.

References

White House Curators
Northern Arizona University alumni
George Washington University alumni
Living people
Year of birth missing (living people)
American women curators